Dürnbach may refer to:

 Dürnbach (Festenbach), a river of Bavaria, Germany, tributary of the Festenbach
 Suhi Potok, German: Dürnbach, settlement in southern Slovenia
 Dürnbach, a district of Gmund am Tegernsee, in Bavaria, Germany
 Dürnbach, a village of Waldegg, Wiener Neustadt-Land District, Austria
 Dürnbach, a village of Dunkelsteinerwald, Melk District in Lower Austria, Austria